(born May 19, 1971), better known under his ring name Magnitude Kishiwada (マグニチュード岸和田), is a Japanese wrestler.

Career
During his highschool life, Fujita trained in artistic gymnastics, mixed martial arts and powerlifting, and years later, he showed interest in professional wrestling. For many years Fujita trained in worked in preliminary matches in Japan's hardcore wrestling promotions, including FMW, W*ING, and Big Japan Pro Wrestling, competing under his real name, and as Toryu ("Dragon Slayer").

Osaka Pro Wrestling (1999–2005)
In 1999, he landed in Osaka Pro, where he became a kaiju character named Monster Zeta Mandora. However, he gained fame in late 2001 by turning heel, donning a more traditional wrestling mask and renaming himself Big Boss MA-G-MA. He left the promotion in 2005.

Dragon Gate (2005–2010, 2012)
His debut in Dragon Gate was heavily hyped. He first arrived wearing a motorcycle helmet, referring to himself as MA-G-MA. In what was to be his debut match, a singles match against CIMA, he instead removed the helmet and embraced CIMA, joining his faction of Blood Generation and renaming himself Magnitude Kishiwada (from the magnitude of an earthquake and the name of his hometown). People questioned the addition of Kishiwada to Blood Generation, since one of the principles of Blood Generation was a "clean face" (i.e. maskless and paintless faces) concept, but CIMA admitted that he only said that when he first formed the group just so Super Shisa couldn't join. Kishiwada would end Masaaki Mochizuki's 11-month reign as Open the Dream Gate Champion, becoming the first non DG-trueborn to win the Dream Gate title. He would suffer a severe shoulder injury, and drop the Dream Gate to Ryo Saito.

Kishiwada would bring one of his running buddies from Osaka Pro, Gamma, into Blood Generation to be his replacement while he was out nursing his injury. However, Gamma and CIMA clashed, and this resulted in Blood Generation splitting in half, with CIMA leading a smaller face faction, and Naruki Doi and Gamma leading a heel faction. Doi's faction would win the rights to the name Blood Generation, but they immediately renounced it, instead renaming themselves the Muscle Outlaw'z. Upon his return, Kishiwada allied with the MO'z.

Kishiwada began making fewer appearances for Dragon Gate. In 2007 he joined the Global Professional Wrestling Alliance, limiting his Dragon Gate time even further. As part of the GPWA, he has appeared in El Dorado, aligned with, but not actually a member of, heel faction Hell Demons. As many of the wrestlers in Dorado were formerly part of the Dragon system, and in a few cases on bad terms with the system, his participation in Dorado and Dragon Gate at the same time is considered controversial.

With the Muscle Outlaw'z stable in Dragon Gate over, Magnitude Kishiwada has joined forces with Masaaki Mochizuki and Don Fujii in an "over 30" team, his first non-heel role in years. Their team would become Open the Triangle Gate Champions on September 28, 2008, beating Yasushi Kanda, YAMATO & Gamma. In 2009, Kishiwada would return to Osaka Pro briefly to participate in the company's 2009 Tennozan tournament, beating Daisuke Harada, Black Buffalo, and Atsushi Kotoge before losing to Billyken Kid in the finals of the tournament.

By the end of 2009 he had stopped appearing on Dragon Gate cards, before returning in 2012 as a member of Kaettekita Veteran-gun. He would also make sporadic appearances over the next years.

Championships and accomplishments
 Doutonbori Pro Wrestling
WDW Single Championship (1 time)
Doutonbori Saikyo Otoko Tournament (2016)
Doutonbori Saikyo Tag King Kettei Tournament (2015) – with Kuuga
 Dragon Gate
Dragon Gate Open the Dream Gate Championship (1 time)
Dragon Gate Open the Triangle Gate Championship (5 times) – Gamma and Naruki Doi (1), CIMA and Masato Yoshino (1), Masato Yoshino and Naruki Doi (1), Don Fujii and Masaaki Mochizuki (1), and Gamma and HUB (1)
 Osaka Pro Wrestling
Osaka Pro Wrestling Championship (1 time)
Osaka Pro Wrestling Tag Team Championship (2 times) – with Takehiro Murahama (1) and Daio QUALLT (1)
Osaka Pro Wrestling Battle Royal Championship (1 time)
Tenno-zan (2002–2004)

Mixed martial arts record

|-
| Loss
|align=center|0–1
| Yasunori Okuda
|Submission (armbar)
|Professional Shooting Vol.28
|
|align=center|1
|align=center|0:25
|Tokyo, Japan
|

References

External links
 

1971 births
Japanese male professional wrestlers
Living people
People from Kishiwada, Osaka
20th-century professional wrestlers
21st-century professional wrestlers
Open the Dream Gate Champions
Open the Triangle Gate Champions